Srilankametrus yaleensis is a species of scorpion in the family Scorpionidae endemic to Sri Lanka.

Etymology
The species name is named after Yala National Park, the most visited and second largest national park in Sri Lanka. It is the region where both type specimens of the species were recorded.

Description
The total length of males is 75 mm and 103 mm in female. The body is uniformly reddish brown to black in color. The telson appears yellowish to reddish brown. Legs are yellow to reddish brown but lighter than body. Chelicerae are yellow with dark reticulation. Anterior manus and fingers are reddish black. Pedipalps are orthobothriotaxic type C. There are 13 to 14 pectinal teeth. In males, pedipalp chela, femur and patella are narrower and longer than in females. Chelae are lobiform and strongly tuberculate with pronounced carinae. Patella of pedipalp consists of several small internal tubercles. Carapace appears smooth, and very sparsely granulated laterally. Tergites are smooth and do not exhibit carinae. Telson are hirsute and elongate. Telson vesicle is similar in size to aculeus.

References

Animals described in 2019
Arthropods of Sri Lanka